Fred Gil is a Portuguese professional tennis player, who currently competes in the ITF Men's Circuit. He has won one doubles title at the ATP World Tour and reached a singles final at the same level. A former world no. 62, he is ranked no. 433 in the world  by the Association of Tennis Professionals (ATP), as of 3 April 2017.

Career finals

ATP World Tour

Singles: 1 (0 titles, 1 runner-up)

Doubles: 1 (1 title, 0 runners-up)

ATP Challenger Tour

Singles: 7 (6 titles, 1 runner-up)

Doubles: 17 (7 titles, 10 runners-up)

ITF Men's Circuit

Singles: 18 (12 titles, 6 runners-up)

Doubles: 42 (26 titles, 16 runners-up)

ITF Junior Circuit

Singles: 6 (3 titles, 3 runners-up)

Doubles: 8 (6 titles, 2 runners-up)

Exhibition

Singles: 1 (0 titles, 1 runner-up)

Performance timelines

''Current through 2017 Australian Open.

Singles

1Held as Hamburg Masters (outdoor clay) until 2008, Madrid Masters (outdoor clay) 2009–present.

Doubles

Wins over top 10 players

Singles
Gil has a career 1–8 against ATP ranked top-10 players.

Head-to-head vs. Top 20 players
This section contains Gil's win-loss record against players who have been ranked 20th or higher in the world rankings during their careers.

Career earnings

* As of 10 April 2017.

National participation

Davis Cup (28 wins, 17 losses)
Gil debuted for the Portugal Davis Cup team in 2004 and has played 45 matches in 20 ties. His singles record is 18–10 and his doubles record is 10–7 (28–17 overall).

   indicates the result of the Davis Cup match followed by the score, date, place of event, the zonal classification and its phase, and the court surface.

Notes

References
General sources
Information about career finals and earnings, Grand Slam seedings, singles and doubles performance timelines, head-to-head records against top-20 players, and national team participation have been taken from these sources:

 
 
 
 
 
 
 
 
 
 
 
 
 
 
 
 
 
 
 
 
 
 
 
 
 
 
 
 
 
 
 
 

Citations

Tennis career statistics